Heritage of the March is a series of 185 vinyl records of marches and galops released from 1973 to 1988. It remains the largest single march music record series in history, featuring close to 3,000 different marches. The records were distributed free by march collector Robert Hoe and the series was continued after his death by the Robert Hoe Foundation created by his wife, Marilyn C. Hoe. Most records featured the marches of two composers (one per side) played by a military, college, high school, or community band. The albums were given volume numbers 1 through 90 and A through QQQQ.

C. L. Barnhouse Company also publishes sheet music under the "Heritage of the March" label.

Series organization 
The liner notes from the first record noted that the series was not meant to be chronological, the order in which composers were presented was determined solely by logistical matters, and the total number of albums in the series was not predetermined. The liner notes also stipulated that "The marches selected have rarely, if ever, appeared in  recorded form. The most popular and widely played marches will be omitted for obvious reasons of policy." Later, the series was envisioned as 15 albums featuring an American composer on one side of the record and a foreign composer on the reverse. All of these early albums were performed by the United States Navy Band under the direction of Donald W. Stauffer.

As the series continued to grow, other military bands in the United States were included with the United States Coast Guard Band, United States Military Academy Band, and the Armed Forces Bicentennial Band recording volumes 16 through 30. Starting with volume 31, the series was opened to a wider number of bands both inside and outside the armed services, including bands outside the United States. These recordings formed the "numbered" portion of the series. The "lettered" portion of the series presented additional music by composers who had already been featured in the numbered albums.

There were a few irregularities in the series' numbering and lettering system. Volumes 89 and OOOO were omitted. Volume QQQQ was erroneously labeled as the previously released Volume PPPP. Volumes 54 and 84 were each two-record sets. All together, there were 91 numbered and 94 lettered albums.

Composers 
The first album was recorded by the United States Navy Band for release in 1973 and featured marches composed by Robert Browne Hall and Carl Teike.

A large variety of composers were featured on the recordings. Some of the most recorded include Fred Jewell, Karl L. King, Monroe Althouse, Russell Alexander, Thomas Brooke, Roland F. Seitz, James M. Fulton, Hermann Blankenburg, Charles Barnhouse, Julius Fučík, and W. P. Chambers. Some records do not feature a specific composer, but are themed albums, such as circus marches, marches of Quebec, or marches featuring the euphonium. Some albums also included concert works or marches from "miscellaneous" composers.

Production 
Robert Hoe obtained most of the sheet music himself for the collection, which was meticulously cataloged and inspected by him and his "staff". There are almost no marches recorded more than once in the series. Many of the records feature specific notes on the marches, either given by the conductor of the group or by Hoe himself. Every album contains notes on topics such as the Heritage of the March series, historical backgrounds on composers, instrumentation, the band recorded, or various personal stories.

The series included some material other than marches, including waltzes and overtures written by the featured composer. Hoe, an avid fan of the euphonium, recorded several euphonium solos such as "Elfriede" by George Swift, and an arrangement of "Figaro" by Paul Yoder. Hoe also allowed bands to record their own personal favorites, and were sometimes used as "fillers" for the LPs.

Many marches that were originally recorded for use in the Heritage of the March series but not included in the LPs were later released as part of the three-volume Navy Band Leftovers and four-volume Miscellaneous Marches. A spinoff series was also created called the Heritage of John Philip Sousa, consisting of 18 LPs featuring Sousa's marches and operettas performed by the U.S. Marine Band.

Availability 

The Heritage of the March records were previously available free of charge to the friends of Robert Hoe and to those who requested them from the Robert Hoe Foundation. Bands who were recorded also received their own records for professional or personal use. The records were produced in small batches of between 600 and 2,000 copies of each record.  The records themselves were never commercially available to the public. Today, it is possible to find these records in libraries, second-hand record stores, and other music archives.

Digital copies of select volumes were officially made available for purchase on Amazon and iTunes beginning in 2010. Altissimo Recordings, in collaboration with the Robert Hoe Foundation, began making the collection available as compact discs with the release of the Heritage of John Philip Sousa in Summer 2011, followed by the first two volumes of the Heritage of the March in 2012.

References

Classical albums
March music
Galops
Military music
Themed compilation albums
1970s compilation albums
1980s compilation albums